Gurteen or Gorteen is a village in County Sligo, Ireland. It is in the civil parish of Kilfree in the baronry of Coolavin. 

Gurteen's population increased from 269 people, at the 2006 census, to 393 at the 2016 census. It is at the intersection of the R293 road (Ballymote to Ballaghaderreen) and the R294 (Boyle to Tobercurry).

Places of interest
 The Michael Coleman Irish Music Centre
 Coleman Cottage, a traditional Cottage, forge and archive

Transport
Bus Éireann routes 460 and 476 provide limited services through Gorteen on selected days of the week.

Gurteen was previously served by Kilfree Junction railway station between Boyle and Ballymote on the Dublin to Sligo line. This station opened in October 1874 and closed in February 1963.

See also
List of towns in the Republic of Ireland
Ballaghaderreen railway station

References

External links
 History of Churches in Gorteen Parish

Towns and villages in County Sligo